Slack v. McDaniel, 529 U.S. 473 (2000), was a United States Supreme Court case in which the Court held that under the Antiterrorism and Effective Death Penalty Act of 1996, a certificate of appealability must be issued by a circuit Justice of judge before an appeal can proceed. The certificate of appealability (COA) may only be issued if the applicant "has made a substantial showing of the denial of a constitutional right."

References

External links
 

United States Supreme Court cases
United States Supreme Court cases of the Rehnquist Court
2000 in United States case law